is a Japanese voice actress and singer from Okayama Prefecture who is affiliated with I'm Enterprise. She debuted as a voice actress in 2017, playing mostly background roles in anime series, as well as playing some roles in a number of video games. In 2018, she played her first main roles as Miku Nishio in the anime series Ongaku Shōjo and Rimuru Tempest in the anime series That Time I Got Reincarnated as a Slime.

Biography
Okasaki was born in Okayama Prefecture on November 22, 1998. After graduating, she became affiliated with the I'm Enterprise agency. She debuted as a voice actress in 2017, playing background and minor roles in anime series such as Love Live! Sunshine!!, Kino's Journey, Aikatsu Stars!, and Classicaloid. She also played roles in the video games Quiz RPG: The World of Mystic Wiz and Hentai Shōjo: Formation Girls, as well as playing several minor roles in the 2018 anime series Idolish7. She would then voice background characters in series such as Ms. Koizumi Loves Ramen Noodles, Citrus, and Slow Start.

In 2018, Okasaki played her first main role as the character Miku Nishino in the anime series Ongaku Shōjo. She also became part of the anime's in-universe musical unit , which performed the anime's opening theme "On Stage Life" and ending theme "Jumping Peace". She was then cast as Rimuru Tempest, the protagonist of the anime series That Time I Got Reincarnated as a Slime. From July to September 2018, she hosted a radio program that aired on the JOQR station in Tokyo.

On July 1, 2021, she made her solo singer debut under King Records with her first single released on September 15, 2021.   She released her second single,  which was released on November 3, 2021. The song "Pedals" was used at the second ending theme song for the anime, The Great Jahy Will Not Be Defeated!.

Okasaki released her first album Blooming on August 17, 2022. The album includes the song "Infinite" which was used as the opening theme to the anime series Extreme Hearts.

Personal life
Okasaki is interested in karaoke and girls' manga. She is skilled at badminton and in playing the piano. She is also skilled in calligraphy and has a grade of three in the use of the brush.

Filmography

Television animation
2017
Love Live! Sunshine!! (Female student)
Classicaloid (Girl)
Elegant Yokai Apartment Life (Female student D)
Blood Blockade Battlefront (Children)
Aikatsu Stars! (Children)

2018
Idolish7 (High school student A, female customer B, female fan A, others)
The Disastrous Life of Saiki K. (female B)
Ms. Koizumi Loves Ramen Noodles (female student A)
Slow Start (Girl)
Citrus (Woman)
Junji Ito Collection (Women)
Shokugeki no Souma (female student B)
Golden Kamuy (Children)
High School DxD Hero (Fox sister)
Last Period (MC)
Hoshin Engi (Daughter)
Ongaku Shōjo (Miku Nishino)
Overlord III (Foil)
Gundam Build Divers (Miyu)
High Score Girl'''That Time I Got Reincarnated as a Slime (Rimuru Tempest)

2019The Magnificent Kotobuki (Maria)Demon Slayer: Kimetsu no Yaiba (Teruko)The Case Files of Lord El-Melloi II: Rail Zeppelin Grace Note (Yvette L. Lehrman)

2020My Next Life as a Villainess: All Routes Lead to Doom! (Mary Hunt)Monster Girl Doctor (Memé Rudon)

2021That Time I Got Reincarnated as a Slime Season 2 (Rimuru Tempest)The Slime Diaries: That Time I Got Reincarnated as a Slime (Rimuru Tempest)My Next Life as a Villainess: All Routes Lead to Doom! X (Mary Hunt)The Great Jahy Will Not Be Defeated! (Maō)Fena: Pirate Princess (Young Abel Bluefield)

2022The Dawn of the Witch (Loux Krystas)Extreme Hearts (Saki Kodaka)

2023World Dai Star (Iroha Senju)Farming Life in Another World (Flowrem)

Original net animation
2021Pokétoon (Jigglypuff)

2022Tales of Luminaria: The Fateful Crossroad (Celia Arvier)

Anime films
2021Seitokai Yakuindomo: The Movie 2 (Yū Hirose)Knights of Sidonia: Love Woven in the Stars (Itsuki Hanma)
2022Idol Bu Show (Mirei Wakatsuki)That Time I Got Reincarnated as a Slime the Movie: Scarlet Bond (Rimuru Tempest)

Video games
2017Quiz RPG: The World of Mystic Wiz (Aspina)Hentai Shōjo: Formation Girls (Amy Johnson)
2018Grand Chase: Dimensional Chaser (Sasha)
2019Magia Record (Hanna Sarasa)
2020Azur Lane (Cooper)The Idolmaster Shiny Colors (Hinana Ichikawa)Sword Art Online: Alicization Lycoris (Medina Orthinanos)Guardian Tales (Goddess of War Plitvice)Grand Summoners (Vicorie)
2021Alchemy Stars (Ophina, Dayna)Uma Musume Pretty Derby (Kiryuin Aoi) Honkai Impact 3 (Klein)
2022Counter:Side (Edith Twins)Koumajou Remilia: Scarlet Symphony (Suika Ibuki)Goddess of Victory: Nikke (Anis)

TBAGrimm Echoes (Clock Rabbit)

Drama CDs
2018Wandering Witch: The Journey of Elaina'' (Avelia)

References

External links
  
Official agency profile 

1998 births
Living people
Anime singers
I'm Enterprise voice actors
Japanese video game actresses
Japanese voice actresses
Japanese women pop singers
King Records (Japan) artists
Voice actresses from Okayama Prefecture
21st-century Japanese actresses